Malé English School (M.E.S.) is a private school in Malé, the capital of the Maldives. M.E.S was established on 10 April 1977.

This school is no longer functioning.

External links
 School website

Educational institutions established in 1977
Schools in the Maldives
Malé
1977 establishments in the Maldives